Bring It On is a 2000 American teen cheerleading comedy film directed by Peyton Reed (in his theatrical film directing debut) and written by Jessica Bendinger. The film stars Kirsten Dunst, Eliza Dushku, Jesse Bradford, and Gabrielle Union. The plot of the film centers around two high school cheerleading teams' preparation for a national competition.

Bring It On was released in theaters in North America on August 25, 2000 and became a box office success. The film opened at the number 1 spot in North American theaters and remained in the position for two consecutive weeks, earning a worldwide gross of approximately $90 million. The film received generally positive reviews and has become a cult classic.

It was the first of the Bring It On film series and was followed by six direct-to-video sequels, none of which contain any of the original cast members: Bring It On Again (2004), which shared producers with the original, Bring It On: All or Nothing (2006), Bring It On: In It to Win It (2007), Bring It On: Fight to the Finish (2009), Bring It On: Worldwide Cheersmack (2017), and the TV film, Bring It On: Cheer or Die (2022).

Plot
Cheerleader Torrance Shipman is a senior at Rancho Carne High School in San Diego. Her boyfriend, Aaron, is at college at Cal State Dominguez Hills, and her cheerleading squad, the Toros, is aiming for a sixth consecutive national title. Torrance is elected the next team captain, replacing her highly successful predecessor, "Big Red" after she graduates. In her first practice as captain, teammate Carver is injured and forced to sit the rest of the season out. Torrance holds auditions for a replacement and gains Missy Pantone, a skilled gymnast who transferred from Los Angeles with her twin brother, Cliff.

While watching the Toros practice, Missy accuses them of plagiarizing their cheers, which Torrance vehemently denies. Missy takes her to L.A. to watch the East Compton Clovers, a squad Missy's previous high school frequently competed against, who perform an identical routine. Isis, the Clovers captain, confronts the two and demands to know what they are doing there. She reveals that Big Red videotaped the Clovers' routines and stole them for the Toros. The Clovers vow to beat the Toros in the national competition, which they could not afford to attend in previous years, and prove that they are better cheerleaders. Torrance worries that she is cursed with bad luck after she dropped the Spirit Stick during a dare at cheer camp over the summer, an object that is never supposed to touch the ground. Meanwhile, Torrance and Cliff begin to get to know each other and a mutual attraction grows between them as Aaron becomes more distant.

After Torrance informs the Toros about the routines, the team votes in favor of using the current routine to win. Torrance agrees, feeling there is no time to learn a new routine, while Missy reluctantly goes along with it. At the Toros' next home game, Isis and her teammates perform the Toros' routine in front of the whole school, humiliating them. After advice from Aaron, Torrance recruits the team to raise money through a car wash and hire choreographer Sparky Polastri. Polastri puts the whole team on a diet and regularly belittles them, but the team learns the routine in time for competition. At Regionals, the team scheduled before the Toros performs Sparky’s routine, embarrassing the team who perform the same routine with little choice. Torrance speaks to a competition official and learns their choreographer has provided the routine for six other teams. As the defending champions, the Toros are granted their place in nationals in Daytona Beach, Florida, but Torrance is warned that a new routine will be expected. Big Red chastises Torrance for her inability to be a leader, and says that if she made any mistake as a squad leader, it was not stealing cheers but rather announcing Torrance as her successor. Crushed by Big Red's words and her failure to lead the squad successfully, Torrance considers quitting.

Aaron recommends that Torrance step down from her position as captain and considers selling her out to her team rivals Courtney and Whitney. When Cliff sees Torrance and Aaron together kissing, he severs his friendship with her. Torrance breaks up with Aaron after confronting him about being distant and not believing in her, as well as catching him cheating. She uses Cliff's previous encouragement and his personally made mixtape for her as inspiration for the team to have a real original routine. When the Toros learn that the Clovers are unable to get the funds to pay for nationals, Torrance asks her father's company to sponsor the team; Isis refuses, calling it "guilt money". Instead, the Clovers write to a local talk show host from their neighborhood and get the funds needed to go to Florida. At nationals, both the Toros and the Clovers make it to the finals, with Cliff making a surprise appearance in the audience to cheer the team on. Torrance and Isis give each other last-minute advice. Ultimately, the Clovers come out victorious, with the Toros coming in second. Despite their loss, the Toros and Clovers leave with a newfound respect for each other, with Isis complimenting Torrance on leading the squad and Torrance admitting the Clovers were deserving of their victory. As the Toros celebrate another successful season, Cliff and Torrance share a kiss.

Cast
 Kirsten Dunst as Torrance Shipman
 Eliza Dushku as Missy Pantone
 Jesse Bradford as Cliff Pantone
 Gabrielle Union as Isis
 Clare Kramer as Courtney
 Nicole Bilderback as Whitney
 Tsianina Joelson as Darcy
 Rini Bell as Kasey
 Nathan West as Jan
 Huntley Ritter as Les
 Shamari Fears as Lava
 Natina Reed as Jenelope
 Brandi Williams as LaFred
 Richard Hillman as Aaron
 Lindsay Sloane as "Big Red"
 Bianca Kajlich as Carver
 Paige Inman as Jessica
 Holmes Osborne as Bruce Shipman
 Sherry Hursey as Christine Shipman
 Cody McMains as Justin Shipman
 Ian Roberts as "Sparky" Polastri
 Ryan Drummond as Theatre Boy
 Peyton Reed cameos as a mime (credited as "Silencio Por Favor").

Production

Development 
Jessica Bendinger, a former journalist and music video director, originally pitched the idea for the film, then titled Cheer Fever, as "Clueless meets Strictly Ballroom set at the National High School Cheerleading Championships", saying she was obsessed with cheerleading competitions on ESPN. Bendinger said the idea combined her love for hip hop music and cheerleading.

The film’s depiction of cultural appropriation was informed by Bendinger's experiences as a white writer covering hip hop artists at music magazine Spin, a predominantly white publication. Said Bendinger: "Having seen white kids emulating hip hop moves at those [cheer] competitions, I thought, 'Well, what if.' I started asking what if questions...until I got to, what if the best team in the country had been stealing their routines? What if that squad they’d been stealing from finally came to show up and compete for their crown?”

Bendinger's pitch was passed over 28 times before finding a home at Beacon Pictures.

Marc Abraham and Thomas Bliss came on board to produce the film, as well as director Peyton Reed who had previously helmed two made-for-television films for Walt Disney.

Casting 
Prior to auditioning for the film, actors were expected to have a cheer prepared. To avoid the use of stunt doubles, Reed required all the actors to participate in a four-week cheerleading camp. Reed and Gabrielle Union met numerous times to discuss the best way to approach her character. "I think she was able to find what was cool about that character, in a way, I doubt other actresses could," Reed explained in an interview, "Whenever she's on the screen she has this charisma."

James Franco and Jason Schwartzman both auditioned for the role of Cliff Pantone. Kirsten Dunst originally turned down the role of Torrance Shipman as she wasn’t interested. Marley Shelton was the second choice for the role but she decided to star in the film Sugar & Spice instead.

Filming 
While editing the film, Reed and editor Larry Bock watched cheerleading exploitation films from the 1970s. The movie clip shown to the cheer team during the 'types of dance inspiration' montage is from Sweet Charity.

Most of the scenes in the film were shot in different locations and high schools in San Diego County, California, as well as San Diego State University.  Local high school cheer squads were used as extras, Filming took place from 12 July 1999 - 10 September 1999.

Reception

Box office
Bring It On was released in North America on August 25, 2000. The film grossed $17,362,105 in 2,380 theaters during its opening weekend, ranking first at the North American box office, beating The Cell. Although it experienced an 34% decline in gross earnings, the film held the top position for a second consecutive week. The film went on to gross $68,379,000 in North America and an additional $22,070,929 in other territories for a total gross of $90,449,929.

Critical response

The film received a 63% approval rating on Rotten Tomatoes based on 120 reviews, with an average rating of 6.00/10. The site's consensus reads: "Despite the formulaic fluffy storyline, this movie is surprisingly fun to watch, mostly due to its high energy and how it humorously spoofs cheerleading." On Metacritic the film has a weighted average score of 52 out of 100, based on 31 reviews, indicating "Mixed or average reviews". Audiences surveyed by CinemaScore gave the film a grade B+ on scale of A to F.

A. O. Scott from The New York Times commended the film for the ability to "gesture toward serious matters of racial/economic inequality", as well as for its "occasional snarl of genuine satire". Kevin Thomas of the Los Angeles Times also favored the film, calling it a "Smart and sassy high school movie fun for all ages." In addition, Thomas commended the film for how it "subversively suggests that sometimes there are more important values in life than winning", as well as for its inclusion of a gay cheerleader character who is comfortable in his sexuality. Kim Morgan of The Oregonian dubbed the film the "newest, and probably first, cheerleading movie." Michael O'Sullivan of The Washington Post also gave a positive review, praising the film's "tart, taut script by first-time screenwriter Jessica Bendinger" as well as its depiction of teenagers.

However, some reviewers criticized the plot and tone of the film. Roger Ebert from the Chicago Sun-Times disliked how the film's bowdlerizing of crude humor to avoid an R rating resulted in a tonally inconsistent film. Ebert opined, "We get a strange mutant beast, half Nickelodeon movie, half R-rated comedy. It's like kids with potty-mouth playing grownup", and awarded the film two out of four stars.

David Sterritt of The Christian Science Monitor praised the writing, though he also likened the storyline's simplicity to "the average football cheer". Vicky Edwards from the Chicago Tribune found the film "Absurdly unrealistic at times." The Seattle Post-Intelligencers Paula Nechak concluded the film was "predictable and surprisingly confusing in its ultimate message."

Many critics praised Kirsten Dunst's performance. In his review, A. O. Scott called her "a terrific comic actress, largely because of her great expressive range, and the nimbleness with which she can shift from anxiety to aggression to genuine hurt." Charles Taylor of Salon notes "among contemporary teenage actresses, Dunst is the sunniest imaginable parodist." Jessica Winter from The Village Voice shared this sentiment, commenting "[Dunst] provides the only major element of Bring It On that plays as tweaking parody rather than slick, strident, body-slam churlishness." Peter Stack of the San Francisco Chronicle, despite giving the film an unfavorable review, commended Dunst for her willingness "to be as silly and cloyingly agreeable as it takes to get through a slapdash film."

Accolades
The film ranked #30 on Entertainment Weeklys list of the 50 Best High School Movies. Roger Ebert recanted his initial negative impression of the film, later referring to Bring It On as the "Citizen Kane of cheerleader movies."

Cultural impact 
In the years since its release, Bring It On has been lauded for being a rare teen film to address issues of systemic inequality, cultural appropriation, and intersectional feminism, which are seen as major factors for the film's continued legacy.

Beatrice Hazlehurst of i-D wrote, "While its racial inclusion — especially among primary characters — already put the film far ahead of its time, the dynamics of social strata woven throughout the tapestry of Bring It On allow it to hold up so well 20 years later. By wrapping its arms narratively around 'not only people of colour, but queer kids and kids who might feel othered,’ Bendinger says Bring It On offered the overlooked and ostracized the chance to see themselves on screen."

This was echoed by actor Jesse Bradford who said, “[The movie] managed to shine a light on problems like appropriation and white fragility… in light of recent history, Bring It On seems relevant right now."

Legacy

Sequels
Bring It On is followed five direct-to-video sequels & one television film sequel:
 Bring It On Again (2004)
 Bring It On: All or Nothing (2006)
 Bring It On: In It to Win It (2007)
 Bring It On: Fight to the Finish (2009)
 Bring It On: Worldwide Cheersmack (2017)
Bring It On: Cheer or Die (2022)

The only sequel to feature any of the original filmmaking crew from Bring It On was 2004's Bring It On Again. The producers of the original film did not return for sequels after Bring It On Again, and none of the films share recurring cast members. Original star Eliza Dushku is quoted in interviews as never having been invited to participate in the sequels. Steve Rash directed two of the sequels and Alyson Fouse wrote four screenplays. Otherwise, none of the films in the Bring It On franchise share personnel.

The five released films following Bring It On share tenuous plot links. The plot of each film typically follows the first film—a competitive cheerleading team changes routines or other elements to win.

Stage musical

A stage version of the film premiered at the Alliance Theatre, Atlanta, Georgia on January 16, 2011. The musical has music by Lin-Manuel Miranda and Tom Kitt, lyrics by Amanda Green, and a book by Jeff Whitty. The director and choreographer is Andy Blankenbuehler. The cast includes Amanda LaVergne as Campbell, Adrienne Warren as Danielle, and Nick Blaemire as Randall, and "award-winning competitive cheerleaders from across the country".

The Alliance Theatre production was nominated for eight Suzi Bass Awards, winning awards for Choreography (Andy Blankenbuehler), Sound Design (Brian Ronan), and World Premiere Play or Musical. The production was nominated for ten Atlanta Theater Fan Awards from www.AtlantaTheaterFans.com in 2011. The production won for Best Musical and Best Choreography (Andy Blankenbuehler).

A national tour of the musical started at the Ahmanson Theatre in Los Angeles in November–December 2011 and then traveled to San Francisco, Denver, Houston, and Toronto. The national tour stars Taylor Louderman as Campbell and Jason Gotay as Randall.  The cast celebrated kicking-off the national tour of the musical on October 22, 2011 by performing skits from the show.

The New York Times reviewer wrote of the Ahmanson Theatre production: "After an opening number truly-dazzles as it reveals the cast’s impressive gymnastic prowess, the score hits its stride after Campbell transfers to Jackson High. Surging R&B grooves and churning lyrics suggest the fingerprints of Mr. Miranda ... the dance numbers for the Jackson crowd kick the musical into high-gear for most of the first act.... Like most entertainments about the trials and triumphs of the teenage years, 'Bring It On' has as much sap as it does pep in its DNA, distinguished primarily by the electrifying dance routines and the elaborate cheer-squad performances."

The musical opened on Broadway at the St. James Theatre, in a limited run, starting on July 12, 2012, in previews, officially on August 1 through December 30, 2012.

Soundtrack

Bring It On: Music from the Motion Picture was released by Epic Records on August 22, 2000. It features multiple tracks from Blaque, who play Clovers cheerleaders in the film. It also includes songs from Daphne & Celeste, 3LW, and a cover of the Toni Basil song "Mickey" by B*Witched.

See also

 List of media set in San Diego

References

External links

 
 
 
 
 
 

2000 films
2000s high school films
2000 independent films
2000s sports comedy films
2000s teen comedy films
American high school films
American independent films
American sports comedy films
American teen comedy films
Beacon Pictures films
Bring It On (film series)
Cheerleading films
2000s English-language films
Films about competitions
Films directed by Peyton Reed
Films produced by Marc Abraham
Films scored by Christophe Beck
Films set in Los Angeles
Films set in San Diego
Films shot in San Diego
Teen sports films
Universal Pictures films
Films distributed by Disney
2000 directorial debut films
2000 comedy films
American female buddy films
2000s feminist films
2000s female buddy films
2000s American films